KDIX (1230 AM, "The Classic 1230") is a radio station licensed to serve Dickinson, North Dakota.  The station is owned by Starrdak, Inc. It airs a classic hits music format. The station gets its network news from CBS. It can also be heard on K264CV 100.7 FM in Dickinson.

The station was assigned the KDIX call letters by the Federal Communications Commission.

History
KDIX  Radio first went on the air May 16, 1947, with 250 watts of power.  It was purchased  by  Lee  and  Darlene  Leiss in  1992  and  the format was  changed  from Top 40 Adult Contemporary,  to  Country  Rock and old songs from the 70's through the 80's   This  format  change  was to increase focus on the main age demographic of the area. Sports, local news and agriculture information, are their main programming features.

References

External links
FCC History Cards for KDIX
KDIX official website

DIX
Classic hits radio stations in the United States
Country radio stations in the United States
Stark County, North Dakota
Radio stations established in 1947